The UConn Huskies softball program is a college softball team that represents the University of Connecticut in the American Athletic Conference.  The Huskies compete in the National Collegiate Athletic Association (NCAA) Division I.  The current head coach is Laura Valentino, who coached her first season in 2020.

The first season of softball at UConn was in 1975.  The team has had five recorded head coaches.

The Huskies have appeared in the Women's College World Series once, in 1993, when they finished tied for fifth with a 1–2 record.

Karen Mullins is the longest-tenured coach and holds nearly all coaching records as a result.

Key

Coaches

Notes

References

 
Lists of college softball head coaches in the United States
UConn Huskies softball